The Embassy of Sweden in Buenos Aires is Sweden's diplomatic mission in Argentina. The ambassador since 2019 is Anders Carlsson. The embassy is located in Puerto Madero and its staff consists (in 2019) of three people from the Ministry for Foreign Affairs and six local employees. In addition to Argentina, the embassy's area of activity also includes Paraguay and Uruguay. The embassy's activities include trade promotion, culture and Sweden promotion, migration and consular affairs, as well as reporting on politics, human rights and the economy.

History
Swedes have been active in Argentina since the beginning of the 19th century; at the Argentine Declaration of Independence in Tucumán on 9 July 1816, the Swede, Johan Adam Graaner, was the only foreigner present. Diplomatic relations between Sweden and Argentina were established in 1834 when a Swedish consulate was opened in Buenos Aires. The Swedish Embassy in Buenos Aires opened in 1906. Until 1914, the address of the embassy was Calle General Guido 1640. The following year, the embassy had been moved to the address Calle Vicente Lopez 1649 and the year after that to the address Calle Rio Bamba 1145 where it remained until 1926. In 1927, the embassy had moved to the address Calle Libertad 1630, where it remained until 1934. In the years 1935–1936, the embassy was located at the address Calle Posados 1209, and in the years 1937–1940, the embassy was located at the address Avenida Alvear 2710. During the years 1941–1942, the embassy was located at the address Sargento Cabral 827 before getting a permanent place for the embassy in 1943 at the address Avenida Corrientes 330. In 1996, a new embassy housed in the Casa de Suecia on Tacuarí 147 was inaugurated.

On 22 December 2010, it was announced that the Swedish government had decided on the same day to close the embassy for financial reasons in 2011. On 22 September 2011, however, it was decided that the closure of the embassy would be suspended and operations would continue. In 2016, the embassy moved to its current location at Olga Cossettini 731 in Puerto Madero.

Buildings

Chancery

Between the chancery opening in 1906 and 1943, it moved around to several locations around Buenos Aires before getting a fixed point on Avenida Corrientes 330 where it stayed for over 50 years. In 1994, the then ambassador Håkan Granqvist, proposed to the Ministry for Foreign Affairs a change of chancellery premises, or a total refurbishment of existing leased premises. Ambassador Granqvist did not like the offices of the Swedish representation on Avenida Corrientes. It was time to renew the embassy. But it wasn't just that. The noise and pollution of the Buenos Aires artery was a constant problem. Avenida Corrientes crosses the 140 meter wide Avenida 9 de Julio at the Obelisco de Buenos Aires and is one of the busiest streets in Buenos Aires. The floor where the embassy worked had limitations that conditioned architectural creativity: a long corridor, with one office behind another, resembling train cars. Between 1992 and 1993 different solutions were analyzed. One was to move the embassy to the Swedish Seamen's Church, another to the modern building complex of Puerto Madero, and a third was to Casa de Suecia (built in 1951). Architects Henrik Östman and Javier Hernán Rojo had to evaluate and calculate the costs involved in renovating the old embassy, or rebuilding the Swedish Association's party rooms, as well as the bar, often empty, on the sixth and seventh floors of the building on Tacuarí 137. It was concluded that the cost of both renovations was similar, but there was an important difference between the two alternatives: Östman and Rojo showed that the two upper floors of the Casa de Suecia allowed a greater range of architectural possibilities. At first, the authorities in Sweden hesitated to choose the Tacuarí Street building as the headquarters of the embassy. But Bengt Krantz of the National Property Board of Sweden approved the project. By then both Ylva Gabrielsson, a diplomat at the embassy, and Lennart Berglund, the president of the Swedish Association, had become enthusiastic collaborators, and were already convinced of the idea. The authorities in Stockholm gave Henrik Östman and Gustavo Helman (of the construction company Helman Estudio) the go-ahead to start work.

The National Property Board of Sweden bought the floors in August 1995 and construction started in February 1996. Both the tenant, that is, the Swedish Ministry of Foreign Affairs, and the owner, the National Property Board of Sweden, communicated permanently with the architects thanks to the fax. The embassy staff moved in at the end of September 1996. In November 1996 the new embassy was inaugurated, very “Swedish”, spacious, welcoming and provided with Scandinavian beech furniture. Clever planning and tasteful decoration was commented on in the Swedish design magazine Form. Argentine architects, for their part, were fascinated by the practical and unassuming stance of the Swedes; such is the case of the ambassador, willing to use, without inconvenience, the same facilities that were offered to his employees. The National Property Board of Sweden's share, ie the embassy, accounted for 21.5% of the building's total area. The floor plan was open and bright and as a popular addition there was a terrace in the southwest outside the break room. All floors were covered with oak parquet from Sweden. The embassy got a better and more representative office. A motto in the project was to do a lot locally and to hire local consultants and contractors where possible. The house was otherwise managed by the Swedish Association and various companies with Swedish connections.

In the autumn of 2016, the embassy was moved to the newly developed financial area Puerto Madero.

Residence
The ambassadorial residence was built in 1937 by the architect Alejandro Enquin and is located at the address Alejandro María de Aguado 2861 in the Palermo district where several ambassadorial residences are located. The building was purchased by the Swedish state in 1950. The previous owner was SKF in Argentina. The house, which comprises four floors, has a façade with sanded artificial stone plaster. The walled plot is 300 square meters. Extensive renovation work was done in 1988, the private floor on the fourth floor was enlarged and the kitchen and bathroom were modernized. The roof terrace overlooks the Río de la Plata river. A total renovation of electrical installations and replacement of the boiler for gas was carried out in 2003. In 2014, the National Property Board of Sweden began a major renovation of the residence.

Heads of Mission

Footnotes

References

External links
 
 

Buenos Aires
Argentina–Sweden relations
Sweden